The 14th Cavalry Regiment is a cavalry regiment of the United States Army. It has two squadrons that provide reconnaissance, surveillance, and target acquisition for Stryker brigade combat teams. Constituted in 1901, it has served in conflicts from the Philippine–American War to the Operation Iraqi Freedom and Operation Enduring Freedom in Afghanistan.

History
The 14th Cavalry was constituted 2 February 1901, by War Department General Order Number 14. The unit was organized at Fort Leavenworth, Kansas, 5 March 1901.

Philippines campaign
The 14th was stationed in the Philippines from 1903–1906 during the insurgency campaigns. Upon successful completion of that campaign in 1906, the regiment then returned home to the United States and took up garrisons in the Pacific Northwest, where it assumed peacetime duties. The regiment was re-deployed to the Philippines in 1909, although this time it was only engaged in garrison duties and training.

Mexican campaign
In 1912, the regiment was called for service in the Mexican campaign. On the night of 5–6 May 1916, a detachment of nine troopers guarding Glenn Springs, Texas came under attack by a band of about 70 Villistas in the Glenn Springs raid, and three privates, William Cohen, Stephen J. Coloe, and Lawrence K. Rogers, were killed on American soil. The unit then joined General John J. Pershing's expeditionary forces in the Mexican Punitive Expedition against Pancho Villa and his forces during the summer of 1916, chasing bandits throughout the Mexican plains. The regiment then returned to Texas, where it began the task of patrolling the border until 1918, when it was called into service in Europe. The Treaty of Versailles was signed before the regiment could cross the Atlantic and the regiment resumed its border patrol mission.

In 1920, the 14th Cavalry Regiment was moved to Iowa, and for approximately the next two decades served in a peacetime capacity.

World War II

On 15 July 1942, the regiment was inactivated, with its personnel and equipment being transferred to the newly-activated 14th Armored Regiment, 9th Armored Division. On 12 July 1943, the regiment was reactivated as the 14th Cavalry Group at Fort Lewis, Washington. On 28 August 1944, the 14th Cavalry Group sailed for Europe, where it landed on Omaha Beach on 30 September and pressed east. On 18 October, the unit's two squadrons were temporarily detached; the 18th Squadron to the 2nd Infantry Division, and the 32nd Squadron to the 83rd Infantry Division.

Battle of the Bulge
The unit regained its autonomy on 12 December 1944 during the latter stages of World War II and began guarding the Losheim Gap in Belgium. On 16 December, the 14th Cavalry Group received the full brunt of the German winter counteroffensive in the Battle of the Bulge. After two days of savage fighting, the unit reassembled at Vielsalm, Belgium and was attached to the 7th Armored Division.

On 23 December, the unit secured the southern flank of the perimeter, which allowed friendly troops to withdraw to safety. On 25 December, the unit was reequipped, attached to the XVIII Airborne Corps and moved back into the Bulge to push back the German Army. After the bloody and brutal fight in the Ardennes Forest, the regiment was assigned to the 3rd U.S. Army, and ended the war near the Austrian border.

Cold War

After World War II, the group was reorganized as the 14th Constabulary Regiment and served as a police unit until 1948, when it was again reorganized as the 14th Armored Cavalry Regiment and served until 1972 as such on "Freedoms Frontier" at Fulda, Bad Kissingen and Bad Hersfeld, Germany, performing reconnaissance and border duties for NATO until its colors were cased and it was replaced by the 11th Armored Cavalry Regiment.

2000s

Iraq
 The regiment was reactivated on 15 September 2000 as the U.S. Army's first reconnaissance, surveillance and target acquisition squadron in the Stryker brigade combat team. From August 2001 to May 2003 1st Squadron as a part of the Army's first Stryker Brigade Combat Team tested various medium weight combat vehicles eventually certifying the 8 wheeled, 20 ton Stryker vehicle during the first ever US Army unit to complete back-to-back Combat Training Center rotations. After training at the National Training Center in March 2003, 1st Squadron loaded its complete complement of tactical vehicles on Navy LSVs in San Diego and discharged them two days later in Beaumont, Tx. A tactical roadmarch then brought the Squadron to its next rotation at the Joint Readiness Training Center, Fort Polk, LA. Upon completion the Squadron (and its Brigade) was certified for combat deployment.

The 1st Squadron deployed to Northern Iraq in October 2003 initially assuming responsibility for the eastern half the City of Samarra. By January 2004 1st Squadron moved to Ninevah Province and relieved 3rd Brigade, 101st AASLT DIV. It conducted counterinsurgency operations in the western portion of Ninevah province until June when it was moved to Takrit, Iraq as the lead security force for logistical operations running from the Kuwait border through Baghdad and return.

In August 2004 1st Squadron returned to its parent brigade in Ninevah province this time its area of operations was the western side of the city of Mosul. The mission was assumed by the 2nd Squadron in October 2004 and, in turn, by the 4th Squadron under the 172nd Stryker Brigade Combat Team in September 2005 until December 2006. The 1st Squadron returned to Iraq in August 2006 for a 15-month deployment.

Initially slated to replace 4th Squadron in Rawah, Iraq the Squadron's mission was changed while the relief in place was taking place. 1st Squadron spent the better part of their 15-month deployment controlling the southwest portion of Baghdad. The 2nd Squadron was reflagged as the 2nd Cavalry squadron in June 2006. Upon finally returning from Iraq in December 2006, the 4th Squadron was reflagged as 5th Squadron, 1st Cavalry. The 1st Squadron returned from their second tour in Iraq to Fort Lewis in September 2007. The newest addition, the 5th Squadron, was activated at Schofield Barracks, Hawaii, on 13 October 2005 and was redesignated as 2nd Squadron, 14th Cavalry, in December 2006.

The 2nd Squadron then served in Iraq from December 2007 to March 2009. 1st Squadron deployed to Iraq for its third deployment in June 2009 establishing ground breaking Kurd-Arab-US tripartite operations in a Combined Security Area in Northern Diyala Province, Iraq; The Squadron's unrivaled team-building skills helped to foster trust amongst two ethnic groups and helped prevent a civil war while furthering to shape a free and democratic nation of Iraq. 2nd Squadron again relieved 1st Squadron in this mission from June 2010 to June 2011 in the Diyala Province.

Afghanistan
From December 2011 to December 2012, TF 1–14 CAV deployed to Zabul Province, Afghanistan, working with the Afghan National Army, Afghan National Police, and local government to conduct wide area security and build the legitimacy of the Afghan government. Bronco Troop was detached working alongside TF 5–20 Infantry in the Zhari District and later the Spin Boldak District along the Afghan-Pakistan border. Apocalypse Troop was also detached to partner with the Australian Army in Uruzgan Province to secure the region. HHT, Crazyhorse Troop, and C/52nd Infantry "Hellcats" secured the entirety of Zabul Province with two Romanian Army battalions and their Afghan partners. Throughout the deployment, the Squadron trained and mentored local forces, placing them in the lead and paving the way for future units.

Current status
 1st Squadron is the Reconnaissance, Surveillance and Target Acquisition (RSTA) Squadron of the 1st Brigade Combat Team (formally 3rd Brigade), 2nd Infantry Division and is stationed at Joint Base Lewis-McChord, Washington.
 2nd Squadron is a Cavalry Squadron of the 2nd Brigade Combat Team, 25th Infantry Division which is an IBCT and is stationed at Schofield Barracks, Hawaii.
 4th Squadron, inactive, was under 172nd Brigade Combat Team, a Stryker unit, before being reflagged to 5th Squadron, 1st Cavalry under 1st Brigade Combat Team, 25th Infantry Division.
 5th Squadron, inactive, was reflagged to 2nd Squadron, 14th Cavalry Regiment.

Recent deployments
1st Squadron
Operation Iraqi Freedom (2003–2004)
Operation Iraqi Freedom (2006–2007)
Operation Iraqi Freedom (2009–2010)
Operation Enduring Freedom (2011–2012)
Department of Defense Support to Customs & Border Protection (2019)

2nd Squadron
Operation Iraqi Freedom (2004–2005)
Operation Iraqi Freedom (2007–2009)
Operation Iraqi Freedom (2010)
Operation New Dawn (2010–2011)

4th Squadron
Operation Iraqi Freedom (2005–2006)

Campaign streamers
The following streamers, representing the indicated campaigns, are flown from the colors of the 14th Cavalry:

Philippine Insurrection
Mindanao
Jolo

World War II
Rhineland
Ardennes-Alsace
Central Europe
Leyte
Ryukyus (with arrowhead)

Iraq War
Iraqi Governance
Iraqi Surge
Iraqi Sovereignty

Heraldry
According to The Institute of Heraldry, the 14th Cavalry Regiment has been granted the following coat of arms:

"Description/Blazon:

Shield: Or, a bend Azure between a Moro kris paleways point up Sable, and a rattlesnake coiled to strike Proper.

Crest: On a wreath of the colors Or and Azure, a dexter arm embowed habited Azure, the hand gloved in a buckskin gauntlet Proper, grasping a staff erect Sable barbed Or, thereon a standard flotant of the last charged with a horseshoe heels upward encircling the Arabic numeral '14' in Black.

Motto: "Suivez Moi" (Follow Me).

Likewise, soldiers assigned to any squadron of the 14th Cavalry are authorized to wear its Distinctive Unit Insignia:

"Description/Blazon:

A gold color metal and enamel device 1 1/8 inches (2.86 cm) in height overall consisting of a shield blazoned: Or, a bend Azure between a Moro kris paleways point up Sable, and a rattlesnake coiled to strike Gules. Attached below the shield a blue scroll inscribed 'SUIVEZ MOI' in Gold letters."

The regimental coat of arms briefly tells part of the history of the unit. The black Moro Kris commemorates more than forty engagements and expeditions in which the 14th participated during the Philippine–American War. The coiled rattlesnake pays tribute to the patrol accomplishments along the Mexican Border during 1912–1918. The blue bend and gold background represent the traditional cavalry color and the uniform of the horse cavalry soldiers.

In popular culture
While the 14th Armored Cavalry Regiment was inactive it was selected by author Harold Coyle to form part of the U.S. Tenth Army Corps in his 1993 techno-thriller "The Ten Thousand".  It was joined by two other inactivated units: the 55th Infantry Division (as the 55th Mechanized Infantry Division) and the 4th Armored Division.

See also
 Observation Post Alpha

References

014
Military units and formations established in 1901
1901 establishments in Kansas